Marais Saline Township is a township in Ashley County, Arkansas, United States.

The name is of French origin meaning "salty pool".

References

Townships in Arkansas
Townships in Ashley County, Arkansas